The USP, for Universal Space Platform, also known as Viktoria, is a highly flexible satellite bus designed and manufactured by RSC Energia. It is called universal because it has been designed to be operated from LEO to GEO. It is a three axis stabilized platform with electric propulsion for station keeping, but chemical propellant is offered as an option.

The platform is designed for direct orbital injection, and thus lacks orbit raising propulsion. It does however, support dual launching on Proton-M, which can enable cheap launching, or the use of smaller vehicles like the Soyuz-2.1b/Fregat-M or even the Dnepr for low energy orbits.

List of USP bus satellites
While not the most successful satellite bus, the USP is characterized by its commercial beginnings and the huge orbital flexibility.

See also
 RSC Energia – The USP bus designer and manufacturer.
 Gazprom Space Systems – Satellite communication division of the Russian oil giant Gazprom.
 Yamal – Communication satellite family operated by Gazprom Space Systems.
 EKS early warning system – A Russian early warning satellite system designed by RSC Energia that is based on the USP bus.

External links
 RSC Energia USP page

References

Satellite buses
Communications satellites
Satellites of Russia